Porches (formerly stylized as PORCHES.) is an American synth-pop project of New York-based musician Aaron Maine, formed in Pleasantville, New York in 2010.

History
Maine has also released music under the names Aaron Maine, Aaron Maine and the Reilly Brothers, Ronald Paris, and Ronnie Mystery.

The band released its second studio album, Pool, on February 5, 2016, to critical acclaim.

The band released its third studio album, The House, on January 19, 2018.

The band's fourth album, Ricky Music, was released on March 13, 2020.

Discography

Studio albums
Slow Dance in the Cosmos (2013)
Pool (2016)
The House (2018)
 Ricky Music (2020)
 All Day Gentle Hold ! (2021)

EPs
Summer of Ten (2011)
Je t'aime (2011)
Scrap and Love Songs Revisited (2011)
Water (2016)

Singles
"Ronald Paris House" (2014)
"Hour" (2015)
"Be Apart" (2016)
"Country" (2017)
"Find Me" (2017)
"rangerover" (2019)
"rangerover- Vegyn Mix" (2020)
"I Miss That" (2020)
"Okay" (2021)
"Lately" (2021)
"Back3School" (2021)

Members

Current lineup 

 Aaron Maine (guitar, vocals, 2010–present) 
 Seiya Jewell (keyboards, 2011–present)
 Maya Laner (bass, vocals, synths, 2013–present)
 Dan English (guitar, 2017–present)
 Noah Hecht (drums, 2018–present)

Former lineup 

 Kevin Farrant (guitar, vocals, 2010–2017)
 Cameron Wisch (drums, 2010–2017)
 Greta Kline (bass, vocals, 2013–2015)

References

External links
 Porches (Bandcamp)

American electronic music groups
Domino Recording Company artists
Musical groups established in 2010
Musical groups from New York (state)
2010 establishments in New York (state)